WESR-FM is an adult contemporary and oldies formatted broadcast radio station licensed to Onley-Onancock, Virginia, serving the Eastern Shore of Virginia.  WESR-FM is owned and operated by Eastern Shore Radio, Inc.

References

External links
103.3 The Shore Online

1968 establishments in Virginia
Mainstream adult contemporary radio stations in the United States
Oldies radio stations in the United States
Radio stations established in 1968
ESR-FM